RD1 is a distant galaxy.

RD1 may also refer to:

 RD1, a wholly owned rural supplier of Fonterra

See also
 R&D1